Janine Greiner (born 13 February 1981) is a Swiss curler.

Greiner started curling in 1989. She plays lead for Mirjam Ott and is right-handed.

Teammates
2010 Vancouver Olympic Games

Mirjam Ott, Skip

Carmen Schäfer, Third

Carmen Küng, Second

Irene Schori, Alternate

References

External links
 

1981 births
Living people
Swiss female curlers
Curlers at the 2010 Winter Olympics
Curlers at the 2014 Winter Olympics
Olympic curlers of Switzerland
World curling champions
Continental Cup of Curling participants
European curling champions
21st-century Swiss women